John Barfoot Macdonld (1918-2018) was a Canadian academic.

Biography
Macdonald was born on February 23, 1918, in Toronto, Ontario, Canada. In 1942, he graduated in Dental Surgery from the University of Toronto. During the Second World War, he served as Dental Corps. He received an M.S. in bacteriology from the University of Illinois in 1948 and a PhD from Columbia University in 1953. In 1949, he started teaching at the University of Toronto, then at Harvard University from 1956, up until 1962, when he became President of the University of British Columbia until 1967.

His 1962 report, Higher Education in British Columbia and a Plan for the Future, led to the establishment of Simon Fraser University and the University of Victoria. He also paved the way for the establishment of the National Sciences and Engineering Council, the Humanities and Social Sciences Council and the Medical Research Council. In the 1970s, he served as CEO of the Council of Ontario Universities.

He received honorary degrees from Harvard University, the University of Manitoba, Simon Fraser University, the University of British Columbia, Wilfrid Laurier University, Brock University, the University of Western Ontario, the University of Windsor and the University of Toronto. He was also named to the Order of Canada.

Macdonald died on December 23, 2014.

Bibliography
Chances and Choices: A Memoir (2001)

References

1918 births
2014 deaths
Canadian expatriates in the United States
University of Toronto alumni
University of Illinois Urbana-Champaign alumni
Columbia University alumni
Academic staff of the University of Toronto
Harvard University faculty
Officers of the Order of Canada
Presidents of the University of British Columbia